Neil Wilson may refer to:

 Neil Wilson (figure skater) (born 1978), British figure skater
 Neil Wilson (baseball) (1935–2013), Major League Baseball player
 Neil Wilson (athlete), New Zealand runner
 Neal C. Wilson (1920–2010), General Conference president of the Seventh-day Adventist Church, 1979–1990
 H. Neill Wilson (c.1854–1926), American architect